Egira dolosa is a moth in the family Noctuidae described by Augustus Radcliffe Grote in 1880. It is found in North America.

The MONA or Hodges number for Egira dolosa is 10513.

References

Further reading
 
Lafontaine, J. Donald & Schmidt, B. Christian (2010). "Annotated check list of the Noctuoidea (Insecta, Lepidoptera) of North America north of Mexico". ZooKeys. vol. 40, 1-239.

External links
Butterflies and Moths of North America

Noctuinae